The taekwondo competition at the 2015 Military World Games was held from 8–10 October 2015 at the KAFAC Indoor Sports Complex in Mungyeong.

Medal summary
Results:

Men's events

Women's events

References

External links
Official website

Military World Games
2015 Military World Games
2015